Lars Fuchs (born 21 June 1982, in Bad Harzburg) is a former German football forward who currently works as assistant U-17 coach for 1. FC Magdeburg.

Career
He began his career in 1995 in the youth team at his home town club FG 16 Vienenburg/Wiedelah before he joined Eintracht Braunschweig in 1999. He played in 119 matches for Braunschweig, including 45 matches in the 2. Bundesliga.

In June 2008, Fuchs transferred to 2. Bundesliga side VfL Osnabrück, signing a contract until 2010, but as he played no role in manager Claus-Dieter Wollitz's future plans, he joined FC Carl Zeiss Jena in January 2009, signing a contract until June 2011. When Fuchs found himself sidelined again, he dissolved the contract in the summer, and joined Regionalliga Nord side 1. FC Magdeburg. He played in 28 games for 1. FC Magdeburg and scored sixteen goals before he signed on 18 May 2010 a three-year contract for Hannover 96 II. After his contract with Hannover ran out, Fuchs returned to 1. FC Magdeburg for another spell, signing a one-year contract.

References

1982 births
Living people
German footballers
Eintracht Braunschweig players
Eintracht Braunschweig II players
VfL Osnabrück players
FC Carl Zeiss Jena players
1. FC Magdeburg players
Hannover 96 II players
People from Goslar (district)
Footballers from Lower Saxony
2. Bundesliga players
3. Liga players
Association football forwards